Artaxias II, also known as Artaxes II and Artashes  (60s BC – 20 BC) was a Prince of the Kingdom of Armenia, member of the Artaxiad Dynasty and King of Armenia from 34 BC until 20 BC.

Family background and early life
Artaxias II was the eldest son of Artavasdes II of Armenia by an unnamed mother and was the namesake of his paternal ancestor, a previous ruling Armenian King Artaxias I. Artaxias II had two siblings: a younger brother called Tigranes III and an unnamed sister who possibly married King Archelaus of Cappadocia. He was born and raised in Armenia.

Kingship
Artaxias II ascended to the Armenian throne in 34 BC as he regained the throne lost by his father. The Roman Triumvir Mark Antony, had captured Artavasdes II with his family, who were then taken as political prisoners to Alexandria where Artavasdes II was later executed on the orders of Cleopatra VII of Egypt. Artaxias II managed to escape and fled to King Phraates IV of Parthia. Phraates IV invaded Armenia and placed Artaxias II on the throne.  As a result, Artaxias II was pro-Parthian and anti-Roman.  With the support of Phraates IV, Artaxias II was successful in a military campaign against Artavasdes I of Media Atropatene, a former enemy of Artavasdes II. 

Artaxias II was said to be spiteful and vengeful.  He massacred the remaining Roman garrison and slaughtered all the Roman traders in Armenia. A possible consequence of this action, when Artaxias II sent emissaries in Rome to try to secure the release of his family then in Roman captivity and the Roman emperor Augustus refused Artaxias II's request. 

Artaxias II proved to be an unpopular leader with his people. As the Armenians lost faith in their ruling monarch, they sent messengers to Augustus requesting him to remove Artaxias II from his throne and to install his brother, Tigranes III as his successor. By 20 BC, Tigranes III had lived in Rome for 10 years. Augustus agreed to the request from the Armenians. Augustus sent his step-son Tiberius, with Tigranes III and a large army to depose Artaxias II. Before Tiberius and Tigranes III arrived in Armenia, a cabal within the palace was successful in murdering Artaxias II. The Romans installed Tigranes III as the new king of Armenia unopposed.

References

Sources
 R. Naroll, V.L. Bullough & F. Naroll, Military Deterrence in History: A Pilot Cross-Historical Survey, SUNY Press, 1974
 H. Temporini & W. Haase, Politische Geschichte (Provinzen Und Randv Lker: Griechischer Balkanraum; Kleinasien): Griechischer Balkanraum; Kleinasien), Walter de Gruyter, 1980
 M. Sicker, The Pre-Islamic Middle East (Google eBook), Greenwood Publishing Group, 2000
 M. Bunsen, Encyclopedia of the Roman Empire, Infobase Printing, 2009
 T. Daryaee, The Oxford Handbook of Iranian History, Oxford University Press, 2012

1st-century BC kings of Armenia
1st-century BC rulers in Asia
20 BC deaths
Year of birth unknown
Artaxiad dynasty